Mr. Bad Guy is the debut studio album by British musician Freddie Mercury, lead singer of Queen. Released in 1985, during a period in which Queen were on hiatus from recording, it contains eleven songs, all written by Mercury himself.

The album was reissued on 11 October 2019, in newly remixed form, on CD, vinyl, digital and streaming services, via Mercury Records.

Background
In contrast to Queen's typically rock-oriented work, Mercury and co-producer Reinhold Mack drew on disco, dance music and pop influences for Mr. Bad Guy, all of which had surfaced on Queen's previous studio album, Hot Space (1982), also produced by Mack. Mercury stated, "I had a lot of ideas bursting to get out and there were a lot of musical territories I wanted to explore which I really couldn't do within Queen." Co-producer Mack added, "he used to get pretty annoyed working with the others, because there was always Brian saying, 'It needs to be more rock 'n' roll.'" Mr. Bad Guy took nearly two years to record, as Mercury had to gather enough material together while committing to band activities.

Initially, the album was supposed to feature duets with Mercury and Michael Jackson.

However, other sources state that personal conflicts were to blame for unfinished tracks. Mercury reportedly dropped out of any further collaboration after feeling uncomfortable working with Jackson's pet llama in the studio. One track from these collaborative sessions, "There Must Be More to Life Than This", was reworked for the Mr. Bad Guy album, although the original recording featuring Jackson was eventually released on Queen Forever in 2014.

Production
Recording was taxing on Mercury, as he took part in everything from performing the tracks (including vocals, piano and synthesizer), arranging the orchestration and working with the sound engineers. Mercury's use of synthesizers and orchestration in track development added to the diversity of each piece. 

The album's original title was Made in Heaven, but Mercury changed his mind weeks before the album went to press.

Originally released on Columbia/CBS, copyrights for Mercury Songs, a company owned by Freddie Mercury's estate, had been revoked following his death in 1991. Mr. Bad Guy would remain out of print on CD until 2000, when it was included on The Solo Collection, and in 2019, when it was reissued and remixed due to the commercial success of Bohemian Rhapsody, a biographical film about him.

Singles
Lead single "I Was Born to Love You" with the non-album B-side "Stop All the Fighting" debuted at number 50 on 14 April 1985, peaking at number 11 on 5 May 1985. It also reached number four in South Africa and number 20 on 1 June in Austria. "Made in Heaven" peaked at number 57 on the UK Singles Chart on 21 July 1985 and charted for four weeks. "Living on My Own" charted at number 50 in the United Kingdom, while the fourth and final single, "Love Me Like There's No Tomorrow," debuted and peaked at number 76 on the UK chart on 24 November 1985.

Re-worked singles
"Living on My Own" was re-released in 1993 (almost two years after Mercury's death) in a remixed form by No More Brothers. The single reached number one in the UK, becoming his most successful solo single release, albeit posthumously. "I Was Born to Love You" became Mercury's only solo chart success in Australia, reaching number 13. That song, and "Made in Heaven", were later reworked by the three surviving Queen members and included on the 1995 studio album Made in Heaven.

Track listing
All songs written by Freddie Mercury.

Personnel

The following personnel are credited in the liner notes.
 Freddie Mercury – vocals, piano, synthesizer
 Fred Mandel – additional piano, synthesizer, rhythm guitar
 Paul Vincent – lead guitar
 Curt Cress – drums
 Stephan Wissnet – bass guitar
 Jo Burt – bass guitar on "Man Made Paradise"
 Mack and Stephan Wissnet – programming
 Rainer Pietsch - orchestral arrangements
Technical
 Mack, assisted by Stephan Wissnet – engineering
 The Artful Dodger – cover art
 Andrzej Sawa – photograph

Charts

Weekly charts

Year-end charts

Certifications

References

Freddie Mercury albums
1985 debut albums
Albums produced by Reinhold Mack
Albums produced by Freddie Mercury
Columbia Records albums